Manthena or Mantena (Telugu: మంతెన) is an Indian family name.

 Manthena Venkata Raju (1904–1968), an Indian politician and social worker from Manthenavaripalem, Bapatla, Andhra Pradesh.

Also see
 Manthenavaripalem, a village in Guntur district in the state of Andhra Pradesh in India.

Indian surnames